Moonshine County Express is a 1977 action film from New World Pictures.

Producer Roger Corman always thought one of the reasons the film was so popular was because it did not put down Southern people. It was one of several Corman financed movies starring John Saxon.

Plot 
Dot refuses to sell out her inheritance—a stockpile of whiskey—when her moonshiner father is murdered by Sweetwater (Morgan Woodward) and his gang by order of Jack Starkey (William Conrad), the local kingpin. Dot and her sisters (played by Claudia Jennings and Maureen McCormick) try to sell the whiskey themselves while avoiding Starkey's men, eventually she gives in to the attentions of J.B. (John Saxon), the local car racer and moonshine runner, so that he will help them sell their stash. A dog is killed, along with the local mechanic and moonshine salesman, so they decide to get out. While trying to get their stockpile out in a rental truck, they are stopped and shot at by Starkey and one of his men. Just when all hope is lost, the local sheriff shows up (Albert Salmi) and arrests Starkey for murdering their uncle Bill (Dub Taylor), who had sold them out by revealing the location of the stash, but then had the temerity to suggest to Starkey that they split the profits. Dot and J.B decide to leave for California, while Dot teases that she might be willing to lower her standards enough to marry J.B.

Cast 
John Saxon - J.B. Johnson
Susan Howard - Dot Hammer
William Conrad - Jack Starkey
Morgan Woodward - Sweetwater
Claudia Jennings - Betty Hammer
Jeff Corey - Hagen
Maureen McCormick - Sissy Hammer
Albert Salmi - Sheriff Larkin
Dub Taylor - Uncle Bill
Len Lesser - Scoggins
Candice Rialson - Mayella
E. J. André - Lawyer Green

Release 
Moonshine County Express has been released on DVD and a blu ray (currently out of print) was released by Code Red DVD.

References

External links

1977 films
1977 action films
1970s exploitation films
Films directed by Gus Trikonis
American exploitation films
American auto racing films
New World Pictures films
1970s English-language films
1970s American films